The Irish League seasons 1915/16-1918/19 were suspended due to World War I. Shelbourne competed in the Irish League and Irish Cup for the 1920/21 season, but resigned from the league and cup during the season following a dispute with the Irish Football Association.

Seasons

Key

Division shown in bold when it changes due to promotion or relegation. Top scorers shown in bold are players who finished the season as top scorer of their division.

Key to league record:
P = Played
W = Games won
D = Games drawn
L = Games lost
F = Goals for
A = Goals against
Pts = Points
Pos = Final position

Key to divisions:
Premier = LOI Premier Division
First = LOI First Division

Key to rounds:
DNQ = Did not qualify
QR = Qualifying Round
PR = Preliminary Round
R1 = First Round 
R2 = Second Round 
R3 = Third Round 
R4 = Fourth Round 
R5 = Fifth Round 

Grp = Group Stage
QF = Quarter-finals
SF = Semi-finals
RU = Runners-up
W = Winners

Notes

References

 
Shelbourne F.C.